The E.W. Corbin House, at 303 E. 5th St. in Salida, Colorado, was listed on the National Register of Historic Places in 1996.

It is a one-and-a-half-story painted brick house, Second Empire in style.

References

National Register of Historic Places in Chaffee County, Colorado
Second Empire architecture in Colorado